Parmenosoma is a genus of longhorn beetles of the subfamily Lamiinae, containing the following species:

 Parmenosoma griseum Schaeffer, 1908
 Parmenosoma villosa (Bates, 1885)

References

Parmenini